Juan López (died 5 August 1501) was a Roman Catholic prelate who served as Bishop of Coria (1499–1501).

Biography
In 1499, Juan López was appointed during the papacy of Pope Alexander VI as Bishop of Coria. He served as Bishop of Coria until his death on 5 August 1501.

References

External links and additional sources
 (for Chronology of Bishops) 
 (for Chronology of Bishops) 

15th-century Roman Catholic bishops in Castile
16th-century Roman Catholic bishops in Spain
Bishops appointed by Pope Alexander VI
1501 deaths